Chima Rameez Okpalaugo better known by his mononym Rameez is an English rapper best known in Germany for being featured on 2011 hit "Think About the Way" by Groove Coverage (a cover of a same-titled original hit by ICE MC) and in "My Party",  a hit by German DJane Housekat.

Career
Born in England, the rapper Rameez appeared in Groove Coverage's album Riot on the Dancefloor with the song "Think About the Way". The song with rap section by Rameez became very popular in Germany reaching #6 on the Top 100 DJ list prompting its release as a single and the first official chart appearance for Rameez reaching number 54 on the official German Singles Chart Media Control Charts.

Based on this initial success, he was featured on another German act, called DJane Housekat in the song "My Party". Released initially as a single-track, it was  released in March 2012 a single. The German TV station ProSieben featured the song in April 2012 as a theme song for its series Comedy Dienstag. The song sampled on the very well-known hit "Let's All Chant" from Michael Zager Band with additional lyrics plus a rap section by Rameez. The theme song generated huge attention and the song showing as top downloads the following week in Germany and Austria. Sony Music released it as a single "My Party" on 20 April 2012 reaching number 4 on official German Media Control Charts and at number 3 in Ö3 Austria Top 40. It also charted in Switzerland. He was also featured in the vocals of "Out Of Control" by the Bodybangers that also featured singing vocals of Linda Teodosiu. In 2013, he was featured in DJane Housekats' second single "All the Time".

Discography

Singles

Featured in

References

External links
Discogs

Living people
Year of birth missing (living people)
English male rappers
Place of birth missing (living people)